Diana M Hoddinott (born 1941) is an English actress. She is best known for playing Annie Hacker, the wife of Jim Hacker, in the television comedy serials Yes Minister and Yes, Prime Minister. She also had a role in the historical film, The Gathering Storm, as Mrs Landemare, the Churchills' housekeeper at Chartwell House.

Biography 
Hoddinott was born at Wincanton, Somerset, the daughter of Alan Hoddinott (1907–1985) and his wife Winifred née Dibble (1909–2003). She was married to fellow actor Harry Towb from 1965 until his death in July 2009. They had three children: Emily, Daniel and Joshua.

Filmography 
 The Inspector Lynley Mysteries (2004)
 The Gathering Storm (2002)
 The Man Who Cried (2000)
 Screen Two (1989)
 Yes Minister (1980-1988)
 Girl Stroke Boy (1971)
 Dixon of Dock Green (1971)
 The Wednesday Play (1966-1968)
 Sergeant Cork (1966)
 Maigret (1963)
 ITV Play of the Week (1963)

References

External links

1941 births
Living people
20th-century English actresses
21st-century English actresses
Actresses from Somerset
English film actresses
English television actresses
People from Wincanton